"The Love You Save" is a song recorded by the Jackson 5 for Motown Records. It was released as a single on May 13, 1970, and held the number-one spot on the soul singles chart in the US for six weeks and the number-one position on the Billboard Hot 100 singles chart for two weeks, from June 27 to July 4, 1970. In the UK top 40 chart, it peaked at number 7 in August 1970. The song is the third of the four-in-a-row Jackson 5 number-ones released (the others were "I Want You Back", "ABC" and "I'll Be There"). Billboard ranked the record as the No. 16 song of 1970, one place behind the Jackson 5's "ABC".

Description
"The Love You Save" features side vocals of Jermaine Jackson singing alongside Michael in the final "Stop! The love you save may be your own", beside Marlon, Tito and Jackie. The song's lyrics feature Michael and Jermaine warning a "fast" girl to slow down and "stop!", because "the love you save may be your own!"  The lyrics are also unusual because of the historical references--according to the song, the girl in question was under the apple tree with "Isaac" (a reference to Isaac Newton); felt electricity with "Benjie" (a reference to Benjamin Franklin); "Alexander" (a reference to Alexander Graham Bell) called her and "rang her chimes"; and "Christopher" (a reference to Christopher Columbus) "discovered" that she was "way ahead of her time".

The opening exclamation, "Stop!", and the foot stomps that complement the rhythm during the latter part of the song are allusions to the 1965 number-one Motown single by the Supremes, "Stop! In the Name of Love".

Others claim that Bobby Taylor, who produced the Jackson 5's first album at Motown and was lead singer of Bobby Taylor & the Vancouvers, discovered the Jackson 5 and brought them to Berry Gordy's attention. Taylor had shepherded them through their first couple of hits in L.A., but Gordy (according to Taylor) felt the material was too adult given the age of the performers, and like the remainder of the early Jackson 5 hits, "The Love You Save" was written and produced back in Detroit by the Corporation, a team comprising Motown chief Berry Gordy, Freddie Perren, Alphonzo Mizell, and Deke Richards, and recorded in Los Angeles, away from the old Motown studio at Hitsville USA in Detroit, Michigan.

"The Love You Save" was the second single from the second Jackson 5 album, ABC.

The song was remixed by DJ Cassidy for the 2009 release The Remix Suite.

Personnel
Lead vocals by Michael Jackson and Jermaine Jackson
Background vocals by Michael Jackson, Jermaine Jackson, Marlon Jackson, Tito Jackson and Jackie Jackson
Instrumentation by Los Angeles area session musicians
Freddie Perren – keyboards 
David T. Walker – guitar
Louis Shelton – guitar 
Don Peake – guitar
Wilton Felder – bass guitar
Gene Pello – drums

Charts

Weekly charts

Year-end charts

See also
"The Life You Save May Be Your Own"
"Stop! In the Name of Love"

References

External links
 Lyrics of this song
 

1970 singles
The Jackson 5 songs
Billboard Hot 100 number-one singles
Cashbox number-one singles
Songs written by Berry Gordy
Songs written by Freddie Perren
Songs written by Deke Richards
Motown singles
Songs written by Alphonzo Mizell
1970 songs